Namazi Mahalleh (also Romanized as Namāzī Maḩalleh; also known as Kalbāfaraj Maḩalleh) is a village in Lisar Rural District, Kargan Rud District, Talesh County, Gilan Province, Iran. At the 2006 census, its population was 191, in 45 families.

References 

Populated places in Talesh County